Paravietnura insolita, is a genus of Springtails belonging to the family Neanuridae.

Body length without antennae is 1.10-1.35 mm. Body with blue pigmented. Body tubercles well developed. Two pigmented 2+2 black eyes found on each side of head. Mouth parts reduced. Body short and squarish. Ordinary chaetae possess four types - long macrochaetae, short macrochaetae, very short macrochaetae and mesochaetae.

References

Neanuridae